NoCGV Barentshav is a large offshore patrol vessel of the Norwegian Coast Guard, and is their first liquefied natural gas-powered vessel. The contract was signed 21 October 2005, and NoCGV Barentshav was delivered in August 2009.

See also

External links 

Article with picture animation from Norwegian Armed Forces 
Remoy Management orders gas-fuelled coast guard vessel based on VS design 

Barentshav-class offshore patrol vessels
Ships built in Romania
2008 ships